Harpalus kadleci is a species of ground beetle in the subfamily Harpalinae. It was described by Kataev & Wrase in 1995.

References

kadleci
Beetles described in 1995